The Niagara Elite College Showcase Program (NECSP), associated with the Niagara Soccer Association, is a travel based youth soccer club out of Niagara Falls, Ontario. The program consists of collaborative teams of elite youth boys and girls soccer players from the Southern Ontario region. The focus of the program is to compete in showcase tournaments with the purpose of having players scouted for university athletic programs both in the United States in the NCAA, and in the Canadian Inter-university Sports league in Canada.

References

Soccer in Ontario
Sport in Niagara Falls, Ontario